The Body Human is a series of specials produced by Tomorrow Entertainment/Medcom Company and telecast by CBS, between 1977 and 1984. They were produced and directed by Robert E. Fuisz and Alfred R. Kelman, who was nominated for an Academy Award in 1966 for The Face of a Genius. The series concentrated on exploring aspects of the human body, from plastic surgery to sexual function. American actor Alexander Scourby was the narrator. The series was nominated for and won Emmy Awards as well as a Peabody Award.

References

1977 American television series debuts
1984 American television series endings
1980s American documentary television series
1970s American documentary television series
Peabody Award-winning television programs
CBS original programming